AleSmith Brewing Company is an American craft brewery located in San Diego, California. It specializes in handcrafted ales in a variety of styles. As of 2015 it produces about 25,000 barrels of beer a  year.

History 
The brewery was founded in San Diego in 1995 by Skip Virgilio and Ted Newcomb. Skip Virgilio was AleSmith's original brewmaster. Peter Zien became brewmaster upon purchasing the company in July, 2002. Zien is a BJCP "Grand Master level 1" beer judge, the only one in San Diego County.

The original brewery is located at 9366 Cabot Drive in San Diego's Miramar area. In 2015 the company added a larger brewery and tasting room, also in Miramar, at 9990 AleSmith Court. At 25,000 square feet, the tasting room is billed as the largest beer tasting room in San Diego County. Brewing operations at the new facility will eventually expand the company's brewing capacity ten-fold, according to Zien.

Beers from the brewery have been rated on RateBeer.com website as #1 Top Brewer in the World 2006 and again in 2013. In 2008, AleSmith was awarded "Small Brewing Company and Small Brewing Company Brewer of the Year" at the Great American Beer Festival.

In 2015, AleSmith announced that Danish gypsy brewer Mikkeller had partnered with them to turn the original facility, located on Cabot Drive, into Mikkeller San Diego.

Awards 
The company has won ten medals in World Beer Cup competition, including six golds. They won for Wee Heavy (gold, 2020); Belgian Strong Ale (bronze, 1998); Winter YuleSmith (gold, 2004); Vintage AleSmith Old Numbskull (gold, 2008); AleSmith Decadence '05 Old Ale (gold, 2008); AleSmith Wee Heavy (gold, 2010); AleSmith Decadence '09 Weizenbock (bronze, 2010); AleSmith Decadence '10 Old Ale (silver, 2012); AleSmith Old Numbskull (bronze, 2012); AleSmith Old Ale '13 (gold, 2014).

At the 2008 Great American Beer Festival, AleSmith Brewing Company won the Small Brewing Company and Small Brewing Company Brewer of the Year Award. By 2013, the AleSmith team had acquired 16 GABF beer medals:
Belgian-Style Strong Ale (silver, 1998); Stumblin’ Monk (bronze, 2000); Wee Heavy Scotch Ale (bronze, 2004); AleSmith IPA (bronze, 2005); Wee Heavy Scotch Ale (silver, 2005); Vintage Speedway Stout (silver, 2008); Old Numbskull Barley Wine (silver, 2008); Decadence ‘05 Old Ale (gold, 2008); Wee Heavy Scotch Ale (gold, 2008); AleSmith IPA (silver, 2011); Old Numbskull Barley Wine (silver, 2011); Decadence ’10 Old Ale (silver, 2011); Grand Cru (bronze, 2012); Decadence ’10 Old Ale (bronze, 2012); Old Numbskull Barley Wine (gold, 2013); Decadence ‘12 Quadruple (silver, 2013); Nut Brown (bronze, 2019)

The beers 

AleSmith's beers are inspired by the brewing styles of Great Britain and Belgium. Some AleSmith beers, such as their Cream Ale and Robust Porter Beer, are only offered on draft or in kegs at the brewery. The majority, however, are available in 22-ounce or 750 ml bottles. These brews are listed below.

Year-round brews

Seasonal Brews

Barrel-Aged Brews

Artwork 
AleSmith's bottles are often accompanied by the trademark AleSmith anvil.

See also 
 List of breweries in San Diego County, California

References

External links 
 AleSmith Brewing Company

Beer brewing companies based in San Diego County, California
Manufacturing companies based in San Diego